Ma Xulun (27 April 18854 May 1970), courtesy name Yichu, was a Chinese politician, activist, and linguist. He was one of the co-founders of the China Association for Promoting Democracy.

Early life
Ma Xulun was an early member of the Tongmenghui. He also joined the South Society founded by Liu Yazi. In 1913, Ma founded Great Republican Daily together with Zhang Taiyan, and became the newspaper's editor-in-chief. In 1913, Ma became a professor at Peking University. During the May Fourth Movement, he was elected to be the president of the Union of Peking High School and College Faculty. In 1921, Ma was appointed as director of education of Zhejiang Province. After the reforms of Beiyang Government, Ma returned to Peking and became twice Deputy Minister of Education. Ma joined Kuomintang in 1923. After the March 18 Massacre, Ma was wanted for opposing Duan Qirui, and fled to Zhejiang. There, Ma called the province governor to support the Northern Expedition against Sun Chuanfang, and was wanted again. After the Kuomintang secured Zhejiang, Ma became Zhejiang's director of civil affairs. He returned to the post of Deputy Minister of Education in 1928.

After the Mukden Incident, Ma Xulun founded North China People's Union for Saving the Motherland (华北民众救国联合会), and Peking Cultural Society's Union for Saving the Motherland (北平文化界救国会). In 1936, he persuaded Sichuan warlord Liu Xiang to avoid a civil war and support the war against Japan. After the Marco Polo Bridge Incident, Ma moved to Shanghai and devoted himself to writing.

After World War II
In 1945, Ma Xulun co-founded the China Association for Promoting Democracy along with Xu Guangping, Zhou Jianren and Zhao Puchu. On 5 May 1946, 52 organizations formed the Shanghai Union of People's Organizations (上海人民团体联合会), and Ma became a member of its standing committee. From 1945 to 1947, Ma also published more than 100 political commentaries on newspapers such as Wenhui Bao.

In late 1947, Ma went to Hong Kong with the help of the Communist Party. In Hong Kong, Ma voiced his support for the Labor Day Slogan, which formed the basis of the future system of multiparty cooperation and political consultation led by Chinese Communist Party. Shortly after, Ma went to Communist Party controlled regions, and supported Mao Zedong's January 1949 statement on the situation of China. In June and September, he attended the Chinese People's Political Consultative Conference Preparatory Conference and the Chinese People's Political Consultative Conference First Plenary Session, and was responsible for selecting People's Republic of China's national flag, emblem and anthem.

After the establishment of People's Republic of China, Ma Xulun became Minister of Education in 1949 and Minister of Higher Education in 1952. In his term, he pushed for the highly influential higher education reform of 1952, which cancelled colleges' autonomy and converted China's education system to one that more closely resembled the Soviet Union, creating a number of specialized colleges. Ma is also vice-president of the 4th Chinese People's Political Consultative Conference, and an academician of Chinese Academy of Sciences, Department of Philosophy and Social Sciences.

Works
Ma Xulun was an expert in Chinese language linguistics, especially in grammatology and historical phonology. His most notable work was the 2.4 million character long Shuowen Jiezi Liushu Shuzheng. Other works include Liushu Jieli, Zhuangzi Jiaozheng, and Laozi Jiaogu. Ma is also a calligrapher with a unique yingtou xiaokai style.

References 

1885 births
1970 deaths
Academic staff of Peking University
People's Republic of China politicians from Zhejiang
Linguists from China
Tongmenghui members
Members of the Kuomintang
Members of the China Association for Promoting Democracy
Ministers of Education of the People's Republic of China
Burials at Babaoshan Revolutionary Cemetery
20th-century linguists